King Edward VII School is a coeducational secondary school and sixth form located in Sheffield, South Yorkshire, England.

History

King Edward VII School, named after the reigning monarch, was formed in 1905 when Wesley College was merged with Sheffield Royal Grammar School on the site of the former on Glossop Road. The former buildings of Wesley College, now King Edward VII Upper School, designed and built by the Sheffield architect, William Flockton in 1838, were Grade II* listed in 1973. The school's history is far older than its regal name suggests. It can be traced directly to a Royal Charter granted in 1604 for the "Free School of King James", the result of a legacy of Thomas Smith who had died the previous year. However, there are traces of the school as far back as the thirteenth century, like a number in other towns of mediaeval England (see Old Edwardians website for more details).

The School supported a Junior School until the advent of the 11-plus entry that was a consequence of the Education Act 1944. The last boys left the Junior School in 1947 and the 1948 entry was the first entirely from the 11-plus. The School has been particularly successful in preparing boys for entry to the University of Oxford and the University of Cambridge. These reached a peak in 1961 (28 Oxbridge entries) and 1962 (26 Oxbridge entries) although after the latter, the headmaster Nathaniel L. Clapton in his 1962 Speech Day address observed that the figure was unlikely to be attained again. At the time the school had about 750 pupils, all boys, of whom around 250 were in the three-year sixth form. Comprehensive and accurate details of the school's academic successes in those years are to be found in the complete collection of Speechday Leaflets on the Old Edwardians' website. By 1962, the school's alumni society at Oxford University, the Seventh Club (see Old Edwardian archives) had 82  members, about one percent of the university's male junior members. In particular, many boys went to The Queen's College, Oxford as the School was one of 20 Schools in Yorkshire, Westmoreland and Cumberland that were eligible for the Hastings Scholarships at that College. As recently as 2014, the school was successful in sending seven students to Oxford and Cambridge.

The final 11-plus examination entry was in 1968 and from September 1969 the School's intake was for a co-educational comprehensive school. Girls were admitted in 1969 to Crosspool Secondary Modern School which became the Lower School for King Edward VII School. In 2005, the school celebrated its 100th anniversary. During 2011–12 a major building programme of extension and refurbishment was undertaken.

Further details about the school's history are to be found on the Old Edwardians website (see references below, Archive). This comprehensive site includes about 1150 relevant articles and photographs, with documents such as School magazines, Speechday Leaflets and official form photographs, plus a list of approximately 400 Old Edwardians. That list includes many in the "golden era" of admissions during the Clapton headship, especially 1952–59, not included in the less widely based Alumni list below, and concentrates on those it has been possible to trace of significant achievement after they left the school. Surprisingly, the school itself maintains no such records. The OE list reveals that a noteworthy proportion of Old Edwardians went on to become professors at universities around the world. Remarkably, there were substantially more Old Edwardian British ambassadors than Old Edwardian members of parliament. The school's historian has picked up on the fact that in 2000, the British ambassadors to Ukraine, Colombia and NATO were all Old Edwardians; all three of them had been 'soldiers' in a school performance of Shakespeare's Julius Caesar in March 1956. As befits an industrial and engineering city such as Sheffield, the school also produced more than its fair share of prominent industrialists and world-class engineers.

Current status
The school has two sites: The Lower School (KS3) on Darwin Lane, and the Upper School (KS4, Sixth Form and Language College) on Glossop Road.

The school is described in the 2006 OFSTED report of 13 September 2006 as a mixed Community Secondary School (11–19). The school has 1,678 students in all, 524 of whom are in the 6th form.

In 2015, the school received an OFSTED score of "Good".

Of the 6th form roughly 50% originate from the Lower School, the remainder coming from other schools in the Sheffield region (many of which are 11–16).

The Chair of Governors is Peter Dickson and the Headteacher is Linda Gooden.

The Upper School was recently refurbished, with the addition of a sports hall and science block, as part of the BSF (Building Schools for the Future) programme; work began in July 2010 and finished in May 2012.

Headteachers of King Edward VII School 
1905–1926 J. H. Hichens MA, LLD (Hons)
1926–1928 S. R. K. Gurner, MC, MA
1928–1938 R. B. Graham, MA
1938–1950 A. W. Barton, MA, PhD
1950–1965 N. L. Clapton, MA
1966–1988 R. Sharrock, MSc
1988–2008 M. H. A. Lewis, MA
2008–2016 Mrs B Jackson, MA
2016 – present Linda Gooden  M Ed

Notable former pupils of King Edward VII School 
See List of Old Edwardians (Sheffield) and also :Category:People educated at King Edward VII School, Sheffield.

Notable former staff of King Edward VII School 
Devon van Oostrum, Professional basketball player 
Henry John Chaytor, 1905–08, Second Master, became Master of St Catharine's College, Cambridge
Francis Ernest Brown, 1905–12, Second Master after Chaytor's departure, became Headmaster of Geelong Grammar School in Australia
Horace Brearley, 1937–46 (father of Mike Brearley, England cricketer)
E F Watling, 1924–60, Classics master and translator of Sophocles

References

Bibliography

External links
King Edward VII School and Language College
Archive of school photos,magazines and list of Old Edwardians
LinkedIn Group
About King Edward VII School
BBC News – King Edward VII School – League Tables
OFSTED report 2002
2005 GCSE results for Sheffield LEA
2005 A-level results for Sheffield LEA
DCSF Achievement and Attainment levels 2007

Educational institutions established in 1905
Secondary schools in Sheffield
Grade II* listed buildings in Sheffield
1905 establishments in England
Community schools in Sheffield
Edward VII schools